Palamu district is one of the twenty-four districts of Jharkhand, India. It was formed in 1892. The administrative headquarters of the district is Medininagar, situated on the Koel River.

History
The Palamu district has sites of Neolithic and Chalcolithic settlement in the confluence of the Son and North Koel rivers in Kabra-Kala mound.

It is speculated that the Kharwars, which formerly controlled Rohtas Fort to the north, migrated to the current territory of the district. The purportedly Kharwar ruler Pratapaghavala, who controlled part of Rohtas district, also built roads into what is now northern Palamu district and had power west of the Son. Kurukh tribes living in northwestern Jharkhand record a tradition of once having controlled the Rohtas fort, but were surprised by their enemies during a festival and forced to flee to the south.

The Cheros record a similar story of once controlling the Rohtas fort but being forced southwards. In the early 16th century, the Cheros were a powerful community of robbers and armed militia based around the jungles of southern Bihar. Sher Shah Suri sent one of his generals, Khawas Khan, to destroy the powerful chief Maharta Chero, a deed so important it was recorded as one of Sher Shah's great deeds in the Wakiat-i-Mustaki.

In the late 16th century, the Raksel Rajputs controlled Palamu. The Mughal commander Man Singh had invaded Palamu, but in 1605 after Akbar died the Mughals were driven out. The Chero ruler Sahabal Rai had become a prisoner in Delhi due to his constant raiding of Bihar. His son, Bhagwat Rai, continued the same policy, but was soon attacked by Mughal forces and fled to Dev Sahi, a Rajput holding the fort of Dhanundanr. With Puran Mal, Dev Sahi's son, he took service with the Raja of Palamu Man Singh. When Man Singh had gone to Surguja in 1613, Rai killed the Raja's family and took his throne. Under Bhagwat Rai's grandson Medini Rai, the Chero kingdom expanded to the height of its territory: covering large parts of what is now southern Bihar, as well as Hazaribagh. Medini Rai was able to launch expeditions against the Maharaja of Chota Nagpur and built the Fort of Palamu.

In 1629, the Mughal subedar of Patna Ahmad Khan forced the Cheros to pay an annual tribute to the Mughals. In 1641, Chero ruler Pratap Rai refused to pay tribute to then-emperor Shah Jahan. Shaista Khan was sent to destroy the Chero kings with an expedition of 15,000 infantry and 5,000 cavalry, which penetrated as far as Ara and laid siege to the Palamu Fort. During the siege, in 1642, the Cheros attacked a Mughal party, but was soon itself defeated, forcing Pratap Rai to give a sum of Rs. 80,000. Pratap Rai was then betrayed by two of his uncles, Tej Rai and Darya Rai, who convinced Itikad Khan, Shaista Khan's successor, to support their coup if Pratap Rai was sent to Patna. The coup was successful, but Tej Rai still held Pratap Rai, so Darya Rai promised to give the fort of Deogan if Itikad Khan supported him with an army. Itikad Khan's army took over Deogan in October 1643 and defeated Tej Rai's force, allowing Pratap Rai to retake Palamu Fort. However as the Mughal army arrived, Pratap Rai surrendered and went to Patna. He agreed to pay Rs. 1 lakh in annual tribute and was made commander of 1000 horse and given Palamu as jagir.

For the next twenty years however, the Cheros neglected to pay their tribute and continued to make raids into Mughal territory in Bihar. At the time Palamu was described as a well-populated city protected by two strong forts. In 1660, however, Subedar of Bihar Daud Khan had enough and invaded Chero territory. Khan first conquered Kotna, which the Cheros had abandoned, proceeded to Palamu Fort which took months due to the thick jungle. After a long struggle, Khan conquered the fort of Palamu and forced the Chero king to flee. The Cheros briefly regained the fort of Deogan, but soon lost it and Palamu was placed under a Muslim faujdar. In 1666 it fell under the direct control of the Subedar of Bihar, and became a fief. The Cheros still held the southern part of the district, but the northern part was given to various nobles. The Raja of Sonpura was the most important of these families, but had fallen out of favour with the Mughal court and lost his lands to Ghulam Hussain Khan after a protracted struggle. Khan controlled much of the northwest of present-day Jharkhand, even as far as the Chota Nagpur kingdom.

In 1720, Palamu was invaded again due to refusal to pay tribute, although the expedition leader was bought off with a large sum of gold and diamonds, and the Mughals invaded again in 1740. At this time the Raja of Ramgarh was the most powerful hill chieftain, and making alliance with several other rulers he took over the fortress of Ramgarh. The Raja offered no resistance to the Maratha general Raghoji I Bhonsle, who passed through the district on his way to raid Medinipur in Bengal.

Due to dynastic struggles, a Chero pretender had made claim to a British agent in Patna to be the rightful ruler of Chero domains in Palamu. The British took the opportunity to take over Palamu Fort. In 1800, one of the Chero rajas enacted a policy against tenants, who rebelled in the Chero insurrection. This rebellion was put down by British troops, who annexed the district into their own territory.

Geography
The district lies between 23°50′ and 24°8′ north latitude and between 83°55′ and 84°30′ east longitude. It is bordered on the north by Son River & Bihar and on the east by the Chatra and Hazaribagh districts, on the south by Latehar District and on the west by Garhwa District.

The major rivers flowing through Palamu district are Son, Koel and Auranga. The major crops grown are Rice and Sugarcane. Many minerals are found here like Iron ore, Bauxite, Lithium, Dolomite and Coal.

National protected area

Betla National Park is a national park located on the Chota Nagpur Plateau in the LATEHAR district of Jharkhand, India.

Politics 

 |}

Administration 
Palamau district consists of 21 Blocks. The following are the list of the Blocks in Palamau district:

Economy

In 2006 the Ministry of Panchayati Raj named Palamau one of the country's 250 most backward districts (out of a total of 640). It is one of the 24 districts in Jharkhand currently receiving funds from the Backward Regions Grant Fund Programme (BRGF).

Demographics
According to the 2011 census Palamu district has a population of 1,939,869, giving it a ranking of 243rd in India (out of a total of 640). Its population growth rate over the decade 2001-2011 was 25.94%. Palamu has a sex ratio of 929 females for every 1000 males, and a literacy rate of 65.5%. Scheduled Castes and Tribes make up 27.65% and 9.34% of the population respectively.

According to the census, 86.77% of the population follows Hinduism, while 12.28% follow Islam.

Languages 

At the time of the 2011 Census of India, 65.49% of the population in the district spoke Hindi, 24.44% Magahi and 6.87% Urdu as their first language.

Education 
The only university in Medininagar is Nilamber-Pitamber University, created on January 17, 2009. The Chief Minister of Jharkhand declared that the Nilamber-Pitamber University would be set up in Medininagar in 2001. There are 66 primary schools, 30 middle schools, 17 Navsirijit schools, 10 high schools and 1 Engineering College in the Medininagar block.

References

External links
 Official district government website
 Daltongnaj This website contains much information about Palamu
 Jharkhand Tourism

 
Districts of Jharkhand
1928 establishments in India